Christopher Reshard Hudson (born October 6, 1971) is a former American college and professional football player who was a safety in the National Football League (NFL) for seven seasons during the 1990s and early 2000s.  Hudson played college football for the University of Colorado, and earned All-American honors.  A third-round pick of the Jacksonville Jaguars in the 1995 NFL Draft, he also played professionally for the Chicago Bears and Atlanta Falcons of the NFL.

Early years
Hudson was born in Houston, Texas.  He attended Worthing High School in Houston, and played high school football for the Worthing Colts.

College career
While attending the University of Colorado at Boulder, Hudson played for the Colorado Buffaloes football team from 1991 to 1994.  He was a versatile defensive back who could play any position in the backfield and play it well.  As senior in 1994, he was recognized as a consensus first-team All-American and won the Jim Thorpe Award awarded annually to the best college defensive back in the nation.  He finished his college career with the second-most interceptions in Buffaloes team history, and fifth on the team's all-time list for pass deflections.

Professional career
During his six his seasons in the NFL, he played in 77 regular season games, started in 63 of them, and compiled 11 interceptions.

References

Living people
1971 births
All-American college football players
American football safeties
Colorado Buffaloes football players
Jacksonville Jaguars players
Chicago Bears players
Atlanta Falcons players
Players of American football from Houston